Argyra argyria is a species of fly in the family Dolichopodidae. It is distributed in Europe and North Africa.

Distribution
Austria, Belarus, Belgium, Canary Islands, Corsica, Croatia, Czech Republic, Denmark, Finland, France, Germany, Hungary, Italy, Morocco, Norway, Poland, Portugal, Romania, Russia, Slovakia, Spain, Sweden, Switzerland, Netherlands, Ukraine, United Kingdom.

References

Diaphorinae
Insects described in 1824
Taxa named by Johann Wilhelm Meigen
Diptera of Europe
Diptera of Africa